The Red Smith Stakes is an American Thoroughbred horse race run annually at Aqueduct Racetrack in Queens, New York. A race on turf open to horses age three and older, it is typically run in November over a distance of  miles (11 furlongs).

Inaugurated in 1960, it was run as the Edgemere Handicap until 1981. Previously, there had been a race on dirt known as the Edgemere Handicap which was contested at a distance of a mile and one furlong. Last run in 1957, this turf race was renamed the Red Smith Handicap in honor of the late Walter "Red" Smith, an honored and respected sports columnist for over 45 years who won a Pulitzer Prize in 1976. In 2019 it was changed to the Red Smith Stakes.

Since inception, the Red Smith has been run at various distances:
  miles : 1960–1962, 1968–1971, 1994–2005, 2007 to present
  miles : 1963 to 1967
  miles : 1977
  miles : 1972 to 1976, 1978–1993, 2006

Hosted by:
 Belmont Park : 1960–1962, 1968–1993
 Aqueduct Racetrack :  1963–1967, 1994 to present

The Red Smith was run in two divisions in 1977, 1983, and 1986. There was no race in 1979.

In 1984, 1997, 2006 and 2018, the Red Smith was taken off the turf and run on the dirt. The 1997 race was shortened to  miles, and the 2018 race was shortened to  miles.

Records
Speed  record: (at current distance of  miles)
 2:14.44 – Monarch's Maze (1999)

Most wins:

 2 – Boisterous (2011, 2012)
 2 – Drumtop (1970, 1971)

Most wins by an owner:

 3 – Phipps Stable (2011, 2012. 2013)

Most wins by a jockey:
 5 – Ángel Cordero Jr. (1969, 1970, 1977, 1979, 1985)

Most wins by a trainer:
 4 – Claude R. McGaughey III (2011, 2012, 2013, 2020)

References
 The 2007 Red Smith Handicap at the NTRA
 The Red Smith Handicap at the Pedigree Query

Graded stakes races in the United States
Grade 3 stakes races in the United States
Open middle distance horse races
Horse races in New York City
Turf races in the United States
Aqueduct Racetrack
1960 establishments in New York City
Recurring sporting events established in 1960